Taymurzino (Taymırźa) is a rural locality (a selo) and the administrative centre of Taymurzinsky Selsoviet, Dyurtyulinsky District, Bashkortostan, Russia. The population was 661 as of 2010. There are nine streets.

Geography 
Taymurzino is located 17 km southwest of Dyurtyuli (the district's administrative centre) by road. Sultanbekovo is the nearest rural locality.

References 

Rural localities in Dyurtyulinsky District